Alpine skiing at the 2013 Winter Universiade was held at the Nouva Cima Uomo in Passo San Pellegrino - Moena and Alloch Piste in Pozza di Fassa from December 13 to December 20, 2013.

Men's events

Women's events

Medal table

External links
Official results at the universiadetrentino.org.

2013 in alpine skiing
Alpine skiing
2013
Alpine skiing competitions in Italy